Chapel Island may refer to:

Chapel Island, an island in the Islands of Furness, Cumbria, England
Chapel Island (New York), an island in Orange County, New York, United States
Chapel Island (Franklin County), an island in Franklin County, New York, United States
Chapel Island (Alaska), an island in the Hoonah-Angoon Census Area, Alaska
Chapel Island (Canada), an island, designated a National Historic Site of Canada, located in Bras d'Or Lake, Richmond County, Nova Scotia, Canada
Chapel Island 5, properly Chapel Island Indian Reserve No.5, an Indian Reserve on Chapel Island, Richmond County, Nova Scotia, Canada
Chapel Island First Nation, the band government of the Mi'kmaq people Chapel Island Indian Reserve No. 5 
Chapel Island (Halifax), an island near Halifax, Nova Scotia, Canada
Chapel Island, County Down, an island and townland in County Down, Northern Ireland
Four islands in Newfoundland and Labrador are named Chapel Island, two of them with associated islets called Chapel Island Rock.
 Chapel Island, County Galway, an island dedicated to St Caillen with a small, well-preserved church in Connemara, Ireland. 
Dongding Island, also known as Chapel Island, an island in the Taiwan Strait, Jinhu Township, Kinmen County, Republic of China (Taiwan)